

2020

2021

2022

2023

2020s
Punjabi